Twins Party is eleventh studio album by Hong Kong duo Twins. It was released on September 28, 2007. There are three versions released from the album: Standard Version, Gillian Version and Charlene Version.

Background
The album was recorded in early 2007. The recording was finished in the summer of 2007.

Track listing
CD
"Love Attack"
"Sad Love Song"
"絕對遷就"
"士氣"
"金句"
"世界變"
"Love of Prague"
"Wrong to Be Smart"
"Play for Six Years" (Medley)

DVD
"Love Attack"
"Sad Love Song"
"Making Of - Footage"

Charlene Version
"Love of Prague"
"Opposite Words"
"Love Assault"
"Absolutely Accommodate"
"Sad Love Song"
"Golden Words"
"Changed World"
"Morale"
"Black Horse" (Theme song of 'Super Fans')

Gillian Version
"Love Assault"
"Sad Love Song"
"Double the Impact"
"Absolutely Accommodate"
"Morale"
"Golden Words"
"Changed World"
"Wrong to Be Smart"
"Love of Prague"

Source: YesAsia

References

External links
 http://www.yesasia.com/us/twins-party-gillian-version-limited-edition-taiwan-preorder-version/1005033861-0-0-0-en/info.html

2007 albums
Twins (group) albums